Ignaz Eigner, also Ignác and Ignácz (1854 – 1922) was an Austrian lithographer and painter.

Life 
Eigner was born in Budapest. At the age of 14 he came to the Academy of Fine Arts Vienna in 1868, where he remained for four years until 1872. After that, he became famous as a newspaper lithographer, especially for portraits of the Viennese society and for his portraits of the Habsburg imperial family.

Work 
 Alfred Schönwald: Oesterreichs Kaiserhaus. Biographische Gallerie sämmtlicher Glieder des Allerhöchsten Hofes. Portrits by Ignaz Eigner. Verlag Sommer, Vienna 1877. (contains 38 lithographs by Eigner)
 Blatt: Vom Kunsthimmel des Theaters an der Wien. Ein Blatt mit Porträts Wiener Schauspielerinnen von Ignaz Eigner, jetzt in der .

Further works can be found in the Bildarchiv Austria of the Austrian National Library.

Further reading 
 Heinrich Leporini: Eigner, Ignaz. In Ulrich Thieme (ed.): [Thieme-Becker]]. Begründet von Ulrich Thieme und Felix Becker. Band 10: Dubolon–Erlwein. E. A. Seemann, Leipzig 1914,  (Textarchiv – Internet Archive</ref>).
 Emmanuel Bénézit: Dictionary of Artists. Gründ, Paris 2006, vol. 5, .

References

External links 

 

Austrian painters
Austrian lithographers
Austro-Hungarian painters
1854 births
1922 deaths
Artists from Budapest